The Constitution of the Republic of Mauritius is the supreme law of Mauritius, according to Chapter I, Section 2 of the constitution, if any other law is inconsistent with this Constitution, that other law shall, to the extent of the inconsistency, be void. The current Constitution was adopted in 1968. It defines Mauritius as a sovereign democratic State which shall be known as the Republic of Mauritius. The Constitution guarantees to the citizen his fundamental rights: right to liberty and protection of the law, freedom of conscience, freedom of association, of movement and of opinion, freedom of expression, freedom of creed and of religious belief as well as the right to private property. The individual rights protected in the Constitution are mainly negative rights, as opposed to positive rights.  The Constitution establishes clearly the separation of powers between the legislative, the executive and the judiciary.  The Constitution establishes a Supreme Court with unlimited jurisdiction to hear all cases, as well as two courts of appeal, divisions of the Supreme Court, to hear intermediate civil and criminal cases.

See also
 Constitution of Mauritius (1885) The Constitution of Mauritius in PDF
 Supreme Court of Mauritius
 Agalega
 Politics of Mauritius
 Permanent Grant
 Judicial Committee of the Privy Council

References

External links 
 THE CONSTITUTION of the REPUBLIC OF MAURITIUS
 Attorney General of Mauritius